East Fork is the name of the following places in the United States of America:

East Fork, Alaska
East Fork, Arizona
East Fork, California
East Fork Township, Montgomery County, Illinois
East Fork Township, Clinton County, Illinois
East Fork, Kentucky
East Fork Township, Benson County, North Dakota
East Fork Township, Williams County, North Dakota
East Fork State Park, Ohio
East Fork, Pennsylvania

Computing
East Fork was an early name for the Intel Viiv initiative

See also 
East Fork Township (disambiguation)